The Mowachaht/Muchalaht First Nations are a First Nations government on the west coast of Vancouver Island in the Canadian province of British Columbia.  The Mowachaht/Muchalaht First Nations are a member nation of the Nuu-chah-nulth Tribal Council, which spans all Nuu-chah-nulth-aht peoples (incorrectly known as "Nootka") except for the Pacheedaht First Nation.

Their main reserve is at Gold River, British Columbia but the Mowachaht are originally from Yuquot on Nootka Sound, known to history as Friendly Cove, scene of the Nootka Incident and, later, the negotiations and eventual implementation of the Nootka Conventions between Britain and Spain, hosted by the Mowachaht chief Maquinna.

Name
The Mowachaht (pronounced ), which translates to people of the deer, originate from a place called Friendly Cove, or Yuquot (translates to "Wind comes from all directions"). The name Muchalaht translates to the people who hover over the river or the people over the river.

History

In the mid-to-late 18th century, first contact between indigenous peoples in what is now British Columbia, Canada and European explorers first happened in Yuquot.

On July 27, 2006, Chief Jerry Jack of the Mowachaht-Muchalaht First Nations died during an intertribal canoe journey in the Strait of Juan de Fuca, near Dungeness Spit.  Two other members of the canoe's crew were sent to hospital in Port Angeles, Washington.  Chief Jack was well known for his involvement with the story of Luna, the young orphaned human-friendly killer whale who frequented Nootka Sound and was killed by a boat propeller in 2006.

See also
Nuu-chah-nulth
Nuu-chah-nulth language
Nuu-chah-nulth Tribal Council
Maquinna

References

External links
 Mowachaht-Muchalaht First Nations

Nuu-chah-nulth governments
Nootka Sound region